Yessentukskaya is a rural locality 
stanitsa) and the administrative center of Predgorny District, Stavropol Krai, Russia. Population:

References

Notes

Sources

Rural localities in Stavropol Krai